Molybdenum cofactor sulfurase is an enzyme that in humans is encoded by the MOCOS gene.

MOCOS sulfurates the molybdenum cofactor of xanthine dehydrogenase (XDH) and aldehyde oxidase (AOX1), which is required for their enzymatic activities.

References

Further reading 

 
 
 
 
 

EC 2.8.1